John Michael Crawley (born 5 March 1972) is an Australian former soccer player who played as a goalkeeper. Since retiring as a player he has worked as a goalkeeping coach he is the currently goalkeeper coach of Australia.

Playing career

South America
Crawley first travelled to South America on a NSW Schoolboys tour in 1990. This eventually led to his signing with Chilean club Colo-Colo. Crawley spent the next five years at Colo-Colo, including some loan spells to clubs including Lota Schwager and Magallanes. Crawley acted as a liaison officer when the Australian national team stayed in Chile in preparation for the 1994 FIFA World Cup qualification play-off against Argentina in November 1993. He made his first team debut for Colo-Colo in a draw against Atacama in the last game of the 1994 Primera División of Chile. Crawley remained second choice at Colo-Colo, behind Chilean international goalkeeper Marcelo Ramírez, and in 1995 was forced to decide between adopting Chilean citizenship or retaining his Australian passport.

Return to New South Wales
Crawley returned to Australia in 1995. He spent the next decade moving between several clubs, largely in the New South Wales state league, with the exception of a brief spell in the National Soccer League with Sydney United.

Crawley was signed by Central Coast Mariners in December 2004 ahead of the inaugural A-League season. By the start of the season, Crawley had shown good form and established himself as the Mariners first-choice 'keeper. However, a hip injury in the early rounds of the season saw Crawley miss most of the season, his place in the side taken by young goalkeeper Danny Vukovic, who Crawley had coached for several years.

Coaching career
Before his retirement as a player, Crawley had taken up a role as goalkeeping coach at the Mariners, and continued in that role for over a decade, also taking on other coaching duties including video analysis. His role in the development of Mariners goalkeepers Danny Vukovic and Mathew Ryan from young ages to becoming established professionals was particularly notable.

Crawley took up a position with the Australia under-23s in 2015, in the lead-up to the 2016 AFC U-23 Championship.

In 2015, Crawley joined Sydney FC as their goalkeeping coach, following former Mariners head coach Graham Arnold.

Over his years of coaching, he takes heavy influence off the goalkeeping styles of South America, many of which he picked up himself during his time at Colo-Colo. He states that he is often preached for his coaching in one-on-one situations and most notably the side volley, which helped develop his former Mariners goalkeepers.

Honours

Club
Central Coast Mariners
A-League Pre-Season Challenge Cup: 2005

See also
 List of Central Coast Mariners FC players

References

External links
OzFootball Archives

1972 births
Living people
Sportsmen from New South Wales
Australian expatriate soccer players
A-League Men players
National Soccer League (Australia) players
Blacktown City FC players
Central Coast Mariners FC players
Expatriate footballers in Chile
Association football goalkeepers
Colo-Colo footballers
Sydney United 58 FC players
Juventud Puente Alto players
Central Coast Mariners FC non-playing staff
Soccer players from Sydney
Australian soccer players
Association football goalkeeping coaches